Iecava is a town on the via Baltica in Bauska Municipality, in the Semigallia region of southern Latvia.  The town has a population of around 5500 people. Iecava lies 40 km south of Riga and 23 km north of Bauska and was mentioned in historical documents as early as 1492. Until the 2021 Latvian administrative reform took into force on 1 July 2021, Iecava was a village and the center of Iecava Municipality.

History 
The town was founded by Johann Freytag von Loringhoven in 1492. 
Although the town's Latvian name has always been Iecava, internationally it was known by its German name Gross Eckau until the beginning of the 20th century. It was the scene of a victory over Russian forces by Prussian troops fighting for Napoleon during his invasion of the Russian Empire and was also the scene of fighting during the Second World War German retreat from the Soviet Union.

South of the town centre lies a park around the former manor of Count Peter Ludwig von der Pahlen, of which only the foundation walls and some yard buildings remain.  The French General Marshal MacDonald, who commanded the Prussian troops who were fighting as part of the Grande Armée, occupied the Gross-Eckau castle after battle of Ekau during the Napoleonic War with Russia.

The church of Iecava dates from the 17th Century but was damaged in various wars and incidents from the Battle at Gross-Eckau 7 July 1812 to the Second World War and a 1972 fire.

In addition to farming, the town supports manufacturing enterprises including vegetable oil and white spirits.

Notable people 
Prominent Latvians born in Iecava include Friedrich Wilhelm Matisohn (1871-1913) and Arvīds Pelše (1899-1983).

See also 
 Battle of Ekau

References

 
Bauska Municipality
Towns in Latvia
Semigallia